Ayoor is a Town in Edamulakkal Panchayath of Punalur Taluk, Kollam district, Kerala state, India.  Ayoor is located on the M C Road or state highway One. Jadayu Nature Park, Chadayamangalam is only 3.5 km away from ayoor. 32 km east of Kollam City and 55 km north of Thiruvananthapuram City. But the travelling time from Trivandrum and kollam cities are almost same. Ayoor is 17 km south of Kottarakara, 19km from Punalur and Anchal is 8 km away. Chadayamangalam  and Kadakkal lies south of Ayoor, 7 kilometer from Roaduvila 

The place is a commercial center with rubber, paddy, cashew and pepper being the main trading items. The nearest airport is Thiruvananthapuram International Airport, 62 km south of Ayoor.

Kollam Junction Railway Station is 31 km and Trivandrum central Railway station 54 km away from Ayoor.

References

External links
 About Ayoor
 A source page that collected data about ayoor 
 postalcode source;

Cities and towns in Kollam district